Vanakkam Vathiyare is a 1991 Tamil language action film directed by Ameerjan. The film stars Karthik and Saranya. It was released on 1 February 1991.

Plot
Rajappa (Karthik) is a young man who earns his livelihood by engaging in rowdyism. Despite pleas from his mother to stop him from engaging in nefarious activities, Rajappa is adamant on pursuing rowdyism. However when his mother herself becomes a victim of his doings, Rajappa promises his dying mother that he would stop such activities and pursue a different life. He subsequently moves to a village with the intention of leading a quiet, stable life; but on arrival, he realises that the village remains full of terror. The villagers are oppressed by a gangster Malaichami (Radharavi) and his family, though honouring his promise to his mother, Rajappa chooses to remain silent. The village's main entrepreneur, Duraisingam (Jaishankar), who has been a victim of Malaichami's cruel deeds, requests Rajappa to change his ways and deal with the gangster. However, Rajappa refuses to commit himself and a helpless Duraisingam also gives up on his hope. Meanwhile, the atrocities of Malaichami grow wilder and uglier with every passing day and Rajappa is saddened by the plight of the villagers. He thinks of a way to deal with this terror without breaking his promise.

Cast

Karthik as Rajappa
Saranya as Sundari
Jaishankar as Duraisingam
Radharavi as Malaichami
Anuradha as Rosa
Typist Gopu
Thideer Kannaiah
Gajapathi
Shailaja
Dharani
Saleema
Kala
Vaathiyar Raman
Gundu Kalyanam
Nagarajachozhan
Babu Mohan
Naveen
Kalyanji
Master Manuraj
Senji Krishnan
MLA Mallliah
Ravi Varma
Sivaraman

Soundtrack 
Soundtrack was composed by V. R. Sampath Selvan.

References

1991 films
Indian action films
1990s Tamil-language films
Films directed by Ameerjan
1991 action films